Bohars is a commune in the Finistère department of Brittany north-western France.

Bohars is twinned with the village of Tarporley in England, United Kingdom

Population
Inhabitants of Bohars are called Boharsiens in French.

See also
Communes of the Finistère department

References

External links

Official website 
 Mayors of Finistère Association  

Communes of Finistère